Washington statistical areas may refer to:

 Washington (state) statistical areas
 Washington, D.C., statistical areas